Baby Reindeer is an upcoming British drama series created by and starring Richard Gadd based on Gadd's play of the same name for Netflix. The series will consist of eight episodes.

Cast and characters 
 Richard Gadd as Donny
 Jessica Gunning as Martha
 Nava Mau as Teri

Production

Development 
The series was announced in December 2020, with Richard Gadd set to write the series and star. Clerkenwell Films was set to produce. Weronika Tofilska was added as the director in August 2022. In March 2023, Josephine Bornebusch was announced as an additional director.

Casting 
Richard Gadd was cast alongside the series announcement. Jessica Gunning was cast on 26 August 2022. Nava Mau was cast in March 2023.

Filming 
Filming began in mid-August 2022 in Edinburgh at the Grassmarket. Filming also occurred in London. Filming wrapped by early March 2023.

References

External links 
 

British drama television series
Upcoming drama television series
Upcoming Netflix original programming
Television series by Clerkenwell Films
Television shows based on plays
Television shows filmed in Scotland
Television shows shot in London